Gaius Julius Caesar(c. 140 BC – 85 BC) was a Roman senator, a supporter of his brother-in-law, Gaius Marius, and the father of Roman dictator Julius Caesar.

Biography
Caesar was married to Aurelia, a member of the Aurelii and Rutilii families.  They had two daughters, known as Julia Major and Julia Minor, and a son, Gaius, who was born in 100 BC. He was the brother of Sextus Julius Caesar (consul in 91 BC).

Caesar's progress through the cursus honorum is well known, although the specific dates associated with his offices are controversial. According to two elogia erected in Rome long after his death, Caesar was a commissioner in the colony at Cercina, military tribune, quaestor, praetor, and propraetor of Asia. The dates of these offices are unclear. The colony is probably one of Marius' of 103 BC. Broughton dated the praetorship to 92 BC, with the quaestorship falling towards the beginning of the 90s BC. Sumner dated his term as propraetor of Asia from sometime in 92 to at least January or February 90 BC. Brennan, on the other hand, has dated the governorship to the beginning of the decade.

Caesar died suddenly in 85 BC, in Rome, while putting on his shoes one morning. Another Caesar, possibly his father, had died similarly in Pisa. His father had seen to his education by one of the best orators of Rome, Marcus Antonius Gnipho. In his will, he left Caesar the bulk of his estate, but after Marius's faction had been defeated in the civil war of the 80s BC, this inheritance was confiscated by the dictator Sulla.

Family

|-
|style="text-align: left;"|

Footnotes

References

External links 
 

2nd-century BC births
85 BC deaths
2nd-century BC Romans
1st-century BC Romans
Ancient Roman generals
Ancient Roman politicians
Family of Julius Caesar
Gaius
Roman governors of Asia
Roman Republican praetors